Basil Gewargis Hanna or Basil Korkis (born 8 January 1961)  is a former Iraqi international football player of Assyrian descent. Despite having a short career, he is considered to be one of the best players of all time in Iraq, being known for his tenacity and attacking threat.

As a player, Basil took the national team to uncharted territory,  where he was part of the Iraqi "golden team" of the 1980s that included Hussein Saeed and Ahmad Radhi.

Basil is married and they have three daughters together.

Club career
Like all up and coming Iraqi players, "It all started in the streets" as Basil was once quoted. 
As a teenager, he played with the youth league team Homentmen, a youth club belonging to Nadi Al-Armeni (Armenian Club). At the age of 16, he moved on to the club of Tammuz, a Junior team belonging to Nadi Al-Athori, where he caught the eye of the then first division Al-Amana coach Mustufa Auda. Throughout his youth, Basil points to Zia Isaac as the one who coached him into the player he would become. Basil remained in the Iraq Super League for all his career, where he went on to play for Al Shabab and Al Talaba.

He emigrated to Canada, where he played as an amateur with Nineveh Star from 1992. In 1995, he joined semi-professional club Scarborough Astros of the Canadian National Soccer League, helping them to the Ontario Cup Final losing on penalties to St.Catharines Roma Wolves.

International goals 

Scores and results list Iraq's goal tally first.

References

External links
 
 Interview with Basil Gorgis

1961 births
Living people
Iraqi footballers
Iraqi expatriate footballers
Iraq international footballers
Association football midfielders
1986 FIFA World Cup players
Footballers at the 1988 Summer Olympics
Olympic footballers of Iraq
Iraqi Assyrian people
People from Ankawa
Canadian people of Assyrian descent
Amanat Baghdad players
Iraqi Christians
Iraqi emigrants to Canada
Canadian Christians
North York Astros players
Canadian National Soccer League players
Expatriate soccer players in Canada
Iraqi expatriate sportspeople in Canada
Assyrian footballers